Ignace Strasfogel (17 July 1909 – 6 February 1994) was a Polish pianist, composer and conductor.

Biography 
Born in Warsaw, Strasfogel studied at the Hochschule fur Musik in Berlin where he was a pupil of modernist composer Franz Schreker. He began his career as a pianist and vocal coach; notably serving as an accompanist for prestigious artists such as Joseph Szigeti, Gregor Piatigorsky, and Lauritz Melchior among other soloists. In 1926, at the age of 17, his two piano sonatas won the Mendelssohn Prize. In 1934, Strasfogel was forced to emigrate from Nazi Germany to the United States. In America, he worked as a pianist and won fame as conductor of the New York Philharmonic and the Metropolitan Opera. In 1983, Strasfogel ended a 35-year break from composing, producing works for piano, orchestra, chamber music and songs. Strasfogel died in New York City.

His son  (born 1940) is an opera director and librettist.

Selected works

Piano 
 1923/1924 Capriccio mit alten Tänzen nach acht Kupferstichen von Jakob Callot
 Oktober 1924 Scherzo No.1
 1925 Sonata No.1
 1926 Sonata No.2
 1926 Franz Schreker Collection: six piano transcriptions
 1927 Piano transcription Franz Schreker Chamber Symphony
 1946 Preludio fugato
 1988/1989 Rondo
 1992 Scherzo No.2

Guitar 
 ca. 1940 Prélude, Elegie und Rondo

Chamber music 
 ca. 1927 String Quartet No. 1
 1989/1990 String Quartet No. 2

Songs 
 1985 "Dear Men and Women" for baritone and piano

References

Bibliography 
 Ian Strasfogel: Ignace Strasfogel. The Rediscovery of a Musical Wunderkind. Jewish Miniatures 257A. Hentrich & Hentrich, Leipzig 2020, .

1909 births
1994 deaths
Polish composers
20th-century classical composers
Polish conductors (music)
Male conductors (music)
20th-century Polish pianists
Mendelssohn Prize winners
20th-century conductors (music)
Polish male classical composers
Male pianists
20th-century Polish male musicians
Pupils of Franz Schreker
Polish emigrants to the United States